Duwamish may refer to:

 Duwamish tribe, a Native American tribe in Washington state
 Duwamish River, in Washington state
 Duwamish (fireboat)

See also
 Elliott Bay, often called "Duwamish Bay" in the 19th century
 Duwamish Head, a feature on Seattle's Elliott Bay